This is a list of films and TV series set in Santa Catalina Island, California, United States. It covers topical settings and storyline subjects set in or around Santa Catalina Island. Included are individual episodes of TV series.

Films

1910s
 Man's Genesis - 1912 film by director D. W. Griffith, one of the first films made on Catalina Island
 To Have and to Hold -  1916 silent film, starring Mae Murray and Wallace Reid.
 A Prizma Color Visit to Catalina - 1919 film in Prizma Color.

1920s
 Leap Year -  1921 silent film, starring Roscoe Arbuckle, co-directed by James Cruze, partially filmed on Catalina Island
 Beyond the Rocks -  1922 silent film, starring Rudolph Valentino and Gloria Swanson.
 The Primitive Lover -  1922 silent film, starring Constance Talmadge.
 The Dangerous Maid - 1923 silent film, starring Constance Talmadge, partially filmed in Catalina interior.
 The Isle of Lost Ships -  1923 silent film, starring Anna Q. Nilsson, directed by Maurice Tourneur
 Captain Blood -  1924 silent film, starring J. Warren Kerrigan and Jean Paige, with Catalina substituting for Barbados.
 Feet of Clay -  1924 silent film, starring Rod La Rocque and Vera Reynolds, directed by Cecil B DeMille
 The Navigator  - 1924 silent comedy film, directed by and starring Buster Keaton, filmed over a 10-week period in Avalon Bay on Catalina Island
 The Sea Hawk -  1924 silent film, directed by Frank Lloyd
 Women Who Give -  1924 silent film, directed by Reginald Barker, with the island coastline impersonating Cape Cod
 Half a Man (film)  - 1925 silent film, starring Stan Laurel
 Never the Twain Shall Meet -  1925 silent film, directed by Maurice Tourneur, with pickup sequences on the island after the production returned from Tahiti
 The Trouble with Wives -  1925 silent film, starring Florence Vidor, and Esther Ralston, for beach sequence
 Old Ironsides -  1926 silent film, directed by James Cruze, the island posing as the shores of Tripoli
 Sadie Thompson -  1928 silent film, directed by Raoul Walsh and starring Gloria Swanson with Catalina filling in for Pago Pago
 Condemned -  1929 film, starring Ronald Colman and Ann Harding released with both talkie and silent versions.
 Scarlet Seas -  1929 film, starring Richard Barthelmess and Betty Compson
 The Single Standard -  1929 film, starring Greta Garbo

1930s
 My Past - 1931; starring Bebe Daniels
 Island of Lost Souls - 1932; Charles Laughton, Bela Lugosi 
 Rain - 1932 film
 The Narrow Corner - 1933 film; starring Douglas Fairbanks Jr and Patricia Ellis
 Treasure Island - 1934 film
 Mutiny on the Bounty - 1935;  Charles Laughton, Clark Gable 
 Murder on a Honeymoon - 1935 film, starring Edna May Oliver as Hildegarde Withers, takes place on Catalina Island
 Pirate Party on Catalina Isle - 1935 short film; features a pirate-themed variety show set on the island
 Captain Blood - 1935 film
 Captain Calamity - 1936
 Captains Courageous - 1937 film
 You're Only Young Once - 1937; Andy Hardy family vacation movie, starring Mickey Rooney
 Blockade - 1938 film starring Henry Fonda and Madeleine Carroll
 Isle of Destiny - 1939

1940s
 Typhoon - 1940 film; starring Dorothy Lamour and Robert Preston
 Ruthless - 1948 film; starring Zachary Scott, Sydney Greenstreet and Louis Hayward, with scenes filmed at Toyon Bay

1950s
 All Ashore - 1953 film; Mickey Rooney and Dick Haymes
 Dangerous Charter - shot in 1958 but released in 1962, designed to show off the Panavision process
 Battle of the Coral Sea - 1959 film.

1960s
 Platinum High School - 1960 film; Mickey Rooney and Terry Moore.
 Jack the Giant Killer (1962 film) - Noted as the 500th movie in 30 years filmed at Santa Catalina Island
 Much of the 1964 film Raiders from Beneath the Sea was set in and around Avalon.
 Several scenes in the 1966 romantic comedy film The Glass Bottom Boat, starring Doris Day and Rod Taylor, were filmed in and around Avalon and Avalon Harbor on Catalina Island.
 The 1967 teen comedy film Catalina Caper, starring Tommy Kirk, was filmed on Santa Catalina Island.  This movie was later featured in episode 204 of Mystery Science Theater 3000.
 Some of Summer Children (1965), a neo-noir film directed by James Bruner,  was filmed in Avalon.

1970s
 The Night of the Squid (16 January 1970), a documentary by Jacques Cousteau, was filmed in front of the Casino.
 In Bless the Beasts and Children (1971); starring Bill Mumy, parts were filmed east of the Isthmus, including Catalina's "buffalos" (bison) and some locals.
 Several scenes from the 1974 film Chinatown, starring Jack Nicholson and Faye Dunaway, were filmed on Catalina, including one showing the Casino.

1990s
 The 1994 film Sherlock: Undercover Dog was both set and filmed on the island.
 The closing sequence of the 1997 film Suicide Kings, starring Christopher Walken, Denis Leary, Sean Patrick Flanery, Johnny Galecki, Jay Mohr, Jeremy Sisto, and Henry Thomas is a sequence of aerial shots from various parts of Catalina Island.  A long flying pan out the western harbor of the Two Harbors isthmus starts the sequence.
 Portions of the 1998 film Billy's Hollywood Screen Kiss, starring Sean Hayes and Brad Rowe, utilize the Catalina ferry terminal in San Pedro, California as well as locations on Catalina Island, including Avalon Harbor and the Casino building. The film closes with the song "Love Slave of Catalina".

2000s
 The 2003 movie Aquanoids was filmed almost exclusively on the island. In the movie, Avalon was referred to as "Babylon Bay" and the island as "Santa Clara."
 The 2006 TV comedy Falling in Love with the Girl Next Door, featuring Crystal Allen, Ken Marino and Patrick Duffy, takes place on Catalina Island.
 The ending to the 2008 film Step Brothers is supposed to be a wine mixer on the island of Catalina but was actually filmed at the Trump National Golf Course.

Television

1960s
 A 1962 episode of Route 66 called "There I Am - There I Always Am" starring Martin Milner, George Maharis and Joanna Moore was filmed at various locations on Catalina, including Avalon and Little Harbor. Filming took place between March 26 and April 1, 1962.

1970s
 A 1972 episode of Cannon called "The Island Caper", starring William Conrad, Keenan Wynn, was filmed on Catalina, showing various parts of Avalon including the Casino.
 A 1975 episode of Mannix called "Bird of Prey", starring Mike Connors was filmed on Catalina, showing various parts of Avalon including inside the Casino.
 A 1976 episode of Quincy, M.E. called "Hot Ice, Cold Hearts", starring Jack Klugman, Robert Alda and Lynnette Mettey, was filmed on Catalina, showing various parts of the Avalon Harbor and parts of Avalon.
 Catalina was one of the settings for the 1977 CBS TV series Code R.
 Several scenes from an episode of the TV series Emergency! were filmed on Catalina Island

1980s
 In 1984, Catalina and the Avalon Casino were the filming locations for the Airwolf episode titled "Sins of the Past", though the island was given a fictional name.
 In 1989, actor Chad Allen is seen visiting Santa Catalina Island in the promotional video The Real Chad Allen. Allen is seen visiting Avalon there and also snorkeling off the coast in the vicinity of a sunken ship.

1990s
 In 1993, the daytime soap opera The Bold and the Beautiful filmed on Catalina for several episodes, most notably at The Inn on Mount Ada.
 A 3-part episode during Season Six of the TV series Growing Pains where the story was set in Europe, was filmed on the island. In at least one episode, the Casino can be seen in the distance.

2000s
 In 2002, the TV show Endurance was filmed on Parson's Beach, near the west end of the island.
 In an episode from the first season of the Fox series Arrested Development titled "Staff Infection", employees of the Bluth Company get lost on Catalina Island, and are found and transported by a sheep herder in his animal trailer.
 In the MTV reality series Daddy's Girls, Angela and Vanessa decide to spy on their friend, Alycia. As payback for them spying, their cousin Jessica lies and tells them that Alycia went to Catalina, leading Angela and Vanessa to spend hours searching the island.

2010s
 The pilot episode of action series SAF3 takes place on the island.
 Episode 2 of Season 2 of Fear The Walking Dead, "We All Fall Down", takes place on Catalina.
 The series finale of Love, "Catalina", takes place on the island.

See also

 List of films set in Los Angeles
 List of television shows set in Los Angeles
 List of years in film
 List of years in television

References

Santa Catalina Island (California)
Santa Catalina Island
Santa Catalina Island
Santa Catalina Island
Santa Catalina Island

Lists of films and television series